Sione Vaveni Taliaʻuli is a Tongan boxer.  He competed in the 1988 Summer Olympics. Sione Talia'uli won Gold in 1987 for the South Pacific Games (SPG) in the Middleweight division, Gold in the 1988 Oceania Heavyweight division and Gold in the 1990 Oceania Light Heavyweight division. He also competed at the 1990 Commonwealth Games. Talia'uli has a strong Christian background and attends church regularly.

Sources
2009 Deseret News Church Almanac (Salt Lake City, Utah: Deseret News, 2008) p. 327.

References

2. https://nla.gov.au/nla.obj-342802309/view?sectionId=nla.obj-352753484&partId=nla.obj-342820818#page/n48/mode/1up

External links
 

Light-heavyweight boxers
Tongan male boxers
Olympic boxers of Tonga
Boxers at the 1988 Summer Olympics
Commonwealth Games competitors for Tonga
Boxers at the 1990 Commonwealth Games
Tongan Latter Day Saints
Year of birth missing (living people)
Living people
Tongan expatriates in Australia